A near-open vowel or a near-low vowel is any in a class of vowel sound used in some spoken languages. The defining characteristic of a near-open vowel is that the tongue is positioned similarly to an open vowel, but slightly more constricted.

Other names for a near-open vowel are lowered open-mid vowel and raised open vowel, though the former phrase may also be used to describe a vowel that is as low as open; likewise, the latter phrase may also be used to describe a vowel that is as high as open-mid.

Partial list
The near-open vowels with dedicated symbols in the International Phonetic Alphabet are:

 near-open front unrounded vowel 

References 

Vowels by height